is a Japanese footballer who plays as a left back for J3 League club Ehime FC, on loan from Kashiwa Reysol.

Career statistics

Club
.

References

External links

2002 births
Living people
Association football people from Ibaraki Prefecture
Japanese footballers
Association football defenders
Kashiwa Reysol players
Ehime FC players